Prof Muhammad Lutfar Rahman (Bengali: মুহাম্মাদ লুৎফর রহমান) Bangladeshi professor, chemist and researcher. He was 6th vice chancellor (from 20 October 2000 to 3 November 2001) of Islamic University, Bangladesh. He was professor of Rajshahi University at Chemistry department. He is now contract professor of Independent University, Bangladesh in Environmental Science and Management department.

Early life 
M. Lutfor Rahman born on 2 May 1942. His father name is Moulavi Abul Hossain and mother name is  Sikarunnesa.

Education 

 Matriculation: (now SSC), Khoksa Janipur Pilot High School, District First (1958 Batch)
 Intermediate: (now HSC), Pabna Edward College, 6th place in Rajshahi Division (1960 Batch)
 BSc (Hons) in Chemistry, Rajshahi College, Year of Graduation: 1963
 M.Sc in Chemistry (Physical Chemistry), Rajshahi University. Year of Graduation: 1964.
 Ph.D in Physical Chemistry, University of Cambridge. Year of Graduation: 1969

Career 

 1965 – 1973: Assistant Professor, Department of Chemistry, Rajshahi University.
 1973 – 1980: Associate Professor, Department of Chemistry, Rajshahi University
 1980 – 1985: Faculty of Science (on lien) University of Garyunis, Libya
 1980 – 2006: Professor, Department of Chemistry, Rajshahi University.
 1986 – 1989: Chairman, Department of Chemistry, Rajshahi University
 1993 – 1995: Dean, Faculty of Science, Rajshahi University
 1998 – 2000: Pro Vice Chancellor, National University, Gazipur
 2000 –  2001: Vice Chancellor, Islamic University, Bangladesh.
 2006 – Now: Professor (on contract), Department of Environmental Science and Management (SESM) Independent University, Bangladesh (IUB)

Publications

Membership 

 Life Member, Bangladesh Chemical Society
 Member, Evaluation Committee for Chemical Sciences, University Grants Commission.
 Member, Bangladesh Association for the Advancement of Science
 Member, Bangladesh Association for the Advancement of Science
 Former President, Bangladesh Chemical Society, Regional Branch, Rajshahi.
 Former Member, Editorial Board, Journal of Bangladesh Chemical Society.

Workshops 

 Attended a summer institute on ‘Quantum Chemistry’ in Uppsala, Sweden in 1967.
 Attended a summer seminar on ‘Semiconductor Surfaces’ in Ghent, Belgium, 1968.
 Attended the second workshop on ‘Catalyst Design’ held in Trieste, Italy in 1992
 International Conference on Environmental Aspects of Bangladesh (ICEAB)

Honors 

 Commonwealth Academic Staff Fellowship, 1974.
 Awarded an overseas scholarship by the Royal Commission for the Exhibition of 1851, London,1965.

References

External links 
 Scholar google. of Lutfar Rahman
 Research Gate account of Lutfar Rahman
 Curriculum Vitae.pdf of Lutfor Rahman

1942 births
Living people
Bangladeshi chemists
Vice-Chancellors of the Islamic University, Bangladesh
Pabna Edward College alumni
Academic staff of the University of Rajshahi
Rajshahi College alumni
Alumni of the University of Cambridge
University of Rajshahi alumni
Academic staff of the University of Benghazi